HMS LST 3519 was a Landing Ship, Tank of the Royal Navy, entering service during the last months of the Second World War. She was chartered for civilian service as the Empire Baltic from 1946, serving as an early RO-RO ferry until the navy suspended the charter and requisitioned the ship during the Suez Crisis in 1956. She briefly returned to normal service, but was retired soon after and was eventually sold for breaking up.

Career
LST 3519 was built in the Montreal yards of the Canadian subsidiary of Vickers, Canadian Vickers Limited. She was launched on 26 April 1945 and completed in September 1945. After the end of the war she was one of three LSTs chartered by the Government to the firm of F.Bustard & Sons Ltd., who employed the ships in his Atlantic Steam Navigation Company. She was converted to civilian use by Harland & Wolf Ltd, Tilbury. A new bridge was built and accommodation was provided for 50 lorry drivers and 12 passengers. The renamed Empire Baltic made the first voyage of the new company, sailing from Tilbury Docks to Rotterdam on 11 September 1946. The journey took 24 hours The ship spent the next decade conveying army vehicles and personnel across the English Channel. On 24 September 1949, Empire Baltic hit a mine off Borkum, West Germany. Tugs from Borkum and Cuxhaven went to her assistance. The outbreak of the Suez Crisis in 1956 led to her being requisitioned along with the other LSTs operating under Admiralty charter, and Empire Baltic was used to carry Centurion tanks to Alexandria.

She returned to operate for the Atlantic Steam Navigation Company after the end of the conflict, but was withdrawn from service in 1959. She appears to have been briefly operated by the British-India Steam Navigation Company in 1961. Empire Baltic arrived at La Spezia, Italy for breaking up on 10 July 1962.

Notes

References

External links
Photo of Empire Baltic
Photo of Empire Baltic
Photo of Empire Baltic

 

1945 ships
LST (3)-class tank landing ships
Empire ships
Steamships of the United Kingdom
Merchant ships of the United Kingdom
Ferries of the United Kingdom